Sin Joon-Sik (born January 13, 1980) is a South Korean taekwondo practitioner and Olympic medalist. He competed at the 2000 Summer Olympics in Sydney, where he received a silver medal in the lightweight competition.

References

External links

1980 births
Living people
South Korean male taekwondo practitioners
Olympic taekwondo practitioners of South Korea
Taekwondo practitioners at the 2000 Summer Olympics
Olympic silver medalists for South Korea
Olympic medalists in taekwondo
Medalists at the 2000 Summer Olympics
Asian Taekwondo Championships medalists
21st-century South Korean people